The Syrian opposition is the political structure represented by the Syrian National Coalition and associated Syrian anti-Assad groups with certain territorial control as an alternative Syrian government.

The Syrian opposition evolved since the beginning of the Syrian conflict from groups calling for the overthrow of the Assad government in Syria and who have opposed its Ba'athist government. Prior to the Syrian Civil War, the term "opposition" had been used to refer to traditional political actors, for example the National Coordination Committee for Democratic Change; that is, groups and individuals who have had a history of dissidence against the Syrian state.

The first opposition structures to form in the Syrian uprising were local protest-organizing committees. These formed in April 2011, as protesters graduated from spontaneous protests to protests organized by meetings beforehand.

The Syrian uprising phase, from March 2011 until the start of August 2011, was characterized by a consensus for nonviolent struggle among the uprising's participants. Thus the conflict could not have been yet characterized as a "civil war", until army units defected in response to government reprisals against the protest movement. This occurred 2012, allowing the conflict to meet the definition of "civil war."

Opposition groups in Syria took a new turn in late 2011, during the Syrian Civil War, as they united to form the Syrian National Council (SNC), which has received significant international support and recognition as a partner for dialogue. The Syrian National Council was recognized or supported in some capacity by at least 17 member states of the United Nations, with three of those (France, United Kingdom and the United States) being permanent members of the Security Council.

A broader opposition umbrella group, the National Coalition for Syrian Revolutionary and Opposition Forces, was formed in November 2012 and has gained recognition as the "legitimate representative of the Syrian people" by the Cooperation Council for the Arab States of the Gulf (CCASG) and as a "representative of aspirations of Syrian people" by the Arab League. The Syrian National Coalition was subsequently considered to take the seat of Syria in the Arab League, with the representative of Bashar Al-Assad's government suspended that year. The Syrian National Council, initially a part of the Syrian National Coalition, withdrew on 20 January 2014 in protest at the decision of the coalition to attend the Geneva talks. Despite tensions, the Syrian National Council retained a degree of ties with the National Coalition for Syrian Revolutionary and Opposition Forces. Syrian opposition groups held reconciliation talks in Astana, Kazakhstan in October 2015. In late 2015, the Syrian Interim Government relocated its headquarters to the city of Azaz in North Syria and began to execute some authority in the area. In 2017, the opposition government in the Idlib Governorate was challenged by the rival Syrian Salvation Government, backed by the Islamist faction Hayat Tahrir al-Sham (HTS).

A July 2015 ORB International poll of 1,365 adults across all of Syria's 14 governorates found that about 26 percent of the population supported the Syrian opposition (41 percent in the areas it controlled), compared to 47 percent who supported the Syrian Arab Republic's government (73 percent in the areas it controlled), 35 percent who supported the Al-Nusra Front (58 percent in the areas it controlled), and 22 percent who supported the Islamic State (71 percent in the areas it controlled). A March 2018 ORB International Poll with a similar method and sample size found that support had changed to 40% Syrian government, 40% Syrian opposition (in general), 15% Syrian Democratic Forces, 10% al-Nusra Front, and 4% Islamic State (crossover may exist between supporters of factions).

Background
Syria has been an independent republic since 1946 after the expulsion of the French forces. For decades, the country was partially stable with a series of coups until the Ba'ath Party seized power in Syria in 1963 after a coup d'état. The head of state since 1971 has been a member of the Assad dynasty, beginning with Hafez al-Assad (19712000). Syria was under emergency law from the time of the 1963 Syrian coup d'état until 21 April 2011, when it was rescinded by Bashar al-Assad, Hafez's eldest surviving son and the current President of Syria.

The rule of Assad dynasty was marked by heavy repression of secular alternatives such as the Arab nationalist Nasserists and liberal democrats. The biggest organised resistance to the Ba’athist rule has been the Syrian Muslim Brotherhood; which successfully capitalised on the widespread Sunni resentment against the Alawite hegemony. Syrian Ikhwan was inspired by the Syrian Salafiyya movement led by Muhammad Rashid Rida, an influential Sunni Islamic theologian who is respected as their Imam. In line with the teachings of Rashid Rida, the Muslim Brotherhood advocates the replacement of the Ba’ath party rule with an Islamic state led by an Emir elected by qualified Muslim delegates known as Ahl al-Hall wa-al-‘Aqd. The Islamic government should implement laws based on sharia (Islamic law) with the assistance of ulema who are to be consulted on solving contemporary challenges. The power of the ruler is also to be checked by the provisions laid out in an Islamic constitution through shura (consultation) with the Ahl al-Hall wa-al-‘Aqd. Assad regime introduced Law No. 49 in 1980 which criminalised the movement and legalised executions of anyone accused of membership with the Brotherhood. In response, the Syrian Islamic Front was established the same year to topple the Assadist military dictatorship through an armed revolution. The Front got widespread support from the traditional Sunni ulema and the conservative population; enabling the Syrian Ikhwan al-Muslimeen to rise as the most powerful opposition force by the 1980s.

As the revolutionary wave commonly referred to as the Arab Spring began to take shape in early 2011, Syrian protesters began consolidating opposition councils.

History
The Istanbul Meeting for Syria, the first convention of the Syrian opposition, took place on 26 April 2011, during the Syrian civil uprising. There followed the Antalya Conference for Change in Syria or Antalya Opposition Conference, a three-day conference of representatives of the Syrian opposition held from 31 May until 3 June 2011 in Antalya, Turkey.

Organized by Ammar al-Qurabi's National Organization for Human Rights in Syria and financed by the wealthy Damascene Sanqar family, it led to a final statement refusing compromise or reform solutions, and to the election of a 31-member leadership.

After the Antalya conference, a follow-up meeting took place two days later in Brussels, then another gathering in Paris that was addressed by Bernard Henri Levy. It took a number of further meetings in Istanbul and Doha before yet another meeting on 23 August 2011 in Istanbul set up a permanent transitional council in form of the Syrian National Council.

Political groups
The Syrian opposition does not have a definitive political structure. In December 2015, members of the Syrian opposition convened in Riyadh, Saudi Arabia: 34 groups attended the convention, which aimed to produce a unified delegation for negotiations with the Syrian government. Notable groups present included:

 the National Coalition for Syrian Revolutionary and Opposition Forces, which supported the implementation of the 2012 Geneva Communique, which calls for the establishment of a transitional governing body in Syria
 the National Coordination Committee for Democratic Change, which called for negotiations on a peaceful transition
 armed groups:
 Jaysh al-Islam
 Ahrar al-Sham
 the Southern Front

The December 2015 convention notably did not include:

 the Kurdish PYD party and its affiliates
 Salafist armed groups such as Al-Nusra Front.

National Coalition for Syrian Revolutionary and Opposition Forces

The National Coalition for Syrian Revolutionary and Opposition Forces is a coalition of opposition groups and individuals, mostly exilic, who support the Syrian revolution side and oppose the Assad government ruling Syria. It formed on 11 November 2012 at a conference of opposition groups and individuals held in Doha, Qatar. It has relations with other opposition organizations such as the Syrian National Council, the previous iteration of an exilic political body attempting to represent the grassroots movement; the union of the two was planned, but has failed to realize. Moderate Islamic preacher Moaz al-Khatib, who had protested on the Syrian street in the early nonviolent phase of the uprising, served a term as the president of the coalition, but soon resigned his post, frustrated with the gap between the body and the grassroots of the uprising inside Syria. Riad Seif and Suheir Atassi, both of whom had also protested on the street in Syria early in the uprising, were elected as vice presidents. Mustafa Sabbagh is the coalition's secretary-general.

Notable members of the Coalition include:
 the Assyrian Democratic Organization: a party representing Assyrians in Syria and long repressed by the Assad government, it has participated in opposition structures since the beginning of the conflict. Abdul-Ahad Astepho is a member of the SNC.

Syrian National Council
The Syrian National Council (al-Majlis al-Waṭanī as-Sūri) sometimes known as SNC, the Syrian National Transitional Council or the National Council of Syria, is a Syrian opposition coalition, based in Istanbul (Turkey), formed in August 2011 during the Syrian civil uprising against the government of Bashar al-Assad.

Initially, the council denied seeking to play the role of a government in exile, but this changed a few months later when violence in Syria intensified. The Syrian National Council seeks the end of Bashar al-Assad's rule and the establishment of a modern, civil, democratic state. The SNC National Charter lists human rights, judicial independence, press freedom, democracy and political pluralism as its guiding principles.

In November 2012 the Council agreed to unite with several other opposition groups to form the National Coalition for Syrian Revolutionary and Opposition Forces, with the SNC having 22 out of 60 seats. The Council withdrew from the Coalition on 20 January 2014 in protest at the decision of the Coalition to attend talks in Geneva.

Notable members of the Council include:
 the Syrian Democratic People's Party, a socialist party which played a "key role" in forming the SNC. The Party's leader George Sabra (a secularist born into a Christian family) is the official spokesman of the SNC, and also ran for chairman.
 the Supreme Council of the Syrian Revolution, a Syrian opposition group supporting the overthrow of Bashar al-Assad's government. It grants local opposition groups representation in its national organization.
 the Syrian Democratic Turkmen Movement: An opposition party, constituted in Istanbul on 21 March 2012, of Syrian Turkmens. Ziyad Hasan leads the Syrian Democratic Turkmen Movement.

National Coordination Committee for Democratic Change
The National Coordination Committee for Democratic Change (NCC), or National Coordination Body for Democratic Change (NCB), is a Syrian bloc chaired by Hassan Abdel Azim and consisting of 13 left-wing political parties and "independent political and youth activists". Reuters has defined the committee as the internal opposition's main umbrella group. The NCC initially had several Kurdish political parties as members, but all except for the Democratic Union Party left in October 2011 to join the Kurdish National Council. Some opposition activists have accused the NCC of being a "front organization" for Bashar al-Assad's government and have denounced some of its members as ex-government insiders.

The NCC generally has poor relationships with other Syrian political opposition groups. The Syrian Revolution General Commission, the Local Coordination Committees of Syria, and the Supreme Council of the Syrian Revolution oppose the NCC calls to dialogue with the Syrian government. In September 2012 the Syrian National Council (SNC) reaffirmed that despite broadening its membership, it would not join with "currents close to [the] NCC". Despite the NCC recognizing the Free Syrian Army (FSA) on 23 September 2012, the FSA has dismissed the NCC as an extension of the government, stating that "this opposition is just the other face of the same coin".

Notable former members of the Committee have included:
 the Syriac Union Party, a party representing the interests of Syriac Christians and affiliated with the Syriac Union Party in Lebanon (itself part of the anti-Assad March 14 Alliance). It has taken part in numerous opposition demonstrations, including storming the Syrian embassy in Stockholm in August 2012. It later left the NCC and joined the Syrian Democratic Council in late 2015. 
 the Democratic Union Party, the main Kurdish party in Syria and the dominant party in the de facto Democratic Federation of Northern Syria. It later left the NCC and joined the Syrian Democratic Council in late 2015.

Syrian Democratic Council

The Syrian Democratic Council was established on 10 December 2015 in al-Malikiyah. It was co-founded by prominent human rights activist Haytham Manna and was intended as the political wing of the Syrian Democratic Forces. The council includes more than a dozen blocs and coalitions that support federalism in Syria, including the Movement for a Democratic Society, the Kurdish National Alliance in Syria, the Law–Citizenship–Rights Movement, and since September 2016 the Syria's Tomorrow Movement. The last group is led by former National Coalition president and Syrian National Council Ahmad Jarba. In August 2016 the SDC opened a public office in al-Hasakah.

The Syrian Democratic Council is considered an "alternative opposition" bloc. Its leaders included former NCC members such as Riad Darar, a "key figure" in the Syrian opposition, and Haytham Manna, who resigned from the SDC in March 2016 in protest of its announcement of the Northern Syria Federation. The SDC was rejected by some other opposition groups due to its system of federalism.

The Syrian Democratic Council was invited to participate in the international Geneva III peace talks on Syria in March 2016. However, it rejected the invitations because no representatives of the Movement for a Democratic Society, led by the Democratic Union Party, were invited.

Other groups affiliated with Syrian opposition
Muslim Brotherhood: Islamist party founded in 1930. The brotherhood was behind the Islamic uprising in Syria between 1976 until 1982. The party is banned in Syria and membership became a capital offence in 1980. The Muslim Brotherhood has issued statements of support for the Syrian uprising. Other sources have described the group as having "risen from the ashes", "resurrected itself" to be a dominant force in the uprising. The Muslim Brotherhood has constantly lost influence with militants on the ground, who have defected from the Brotherhood affiliated Shields of the Revolution Council to the Islamic Front.
Coalition of Secular and Democratic Syrians: nucleus of a Syrian secular and democratic opposition that appeared during the Syrian civil war. It came about through the union of a dozen Muslim and Christian, Arab and Kurd parties, who called the minorities of Syria to support the fight against the government of Bashar al-Assad. The Coalition has also called for military intervention in Syria, under the form of a no-fly zone similar to that of Kosovo, with a safe zone and cities. The president of the coalition, who is also a member of the SNC, is Randa Kassis.
Syrian Turkmen Assembly: A recently formed assembly of Syrian Turkmens which constitutes a coalition of Turkmen parties and groups in Syria. It is against the partition of Syria after the collapse of Baath government. The common decision of Syrian Turkmen Assembly is: "Regardless of any ethnic or religious identity, a future in which everybody can be able to live commonly under the identity of Syrian is targeted in the future of Syria."
Syrian Turkmen National Bloc: An opposition party of Syrian Turkmens, which was founded in February 2012. The chairman of the political party is Yusuf Molla.
Local Coordination Committees of Syria: Network of local protest groups that organise and report on protests as part of the Syrian civil war, founded in 2011. , the network supported civil disobedience and opposed local armed resistance and international military intervention as methods of opposing the Syrian government. Key people are activists Razan Zaitouneh and Suhair al-Atassi.
 Syrian National Democratic Council: formed in Paris on 13 November 2011 during the Syrian civil war by Rifaat al-Assad, uncle of Bashar al-Assad. Rifaat al-Assad has expressed the wish to replace Bashar al-Assad with the authoritarian state apparatus intact, and to guarantee the safety of government members, while also making vague allusions to a "transition". Rifaat has his own political organisation, the United National Democratic Rally.
 Syrian Revolution General Commission: Syrian coalition of 40 Syrian opposition groups to unite their efforts during the Syrian civil war that was announced on 19 August 2011 in Istanbul.

Governance

Syrian Interim Government

At a conference held in Istanbul on 19 March 2013 members of the National Coalition elected Ghassan Hitto as prime minister of an interim government for Syria, the Syrian Interim Government (SIG). Hitto has announced that a technical government will be formed which will be led by between 10 and 12 ministers, with the Free Syrian Army choosing the Minister of Defense. The SIG is based in Turkey. It has been the primary civilian authority throughout most of opposition-held Syria. Its system of administrative local councils operate services such as schools and hospitals in these areas, as well as the Free Aleppo University. By late 2017, it presided over 12 provincial councils and over 400 elected local councils. It also operates a major border crossing between Syria and Turkey, which generates an estimated $1 million revenue each month. It is internationally recognized by the European Union and the United States, among others. It maintains diplomatic ties with some non-FSA rebel groups, such as Ahrar al-Sham, but is in conflict with the more extreme Tahrir al-Sham, which is one of the largest armed groups in Idlib Governorate.

Syrian Salvation Government

The Syrian Salvation Government is an alternative government of the Syrian opposition seated within Idlib Governorate, which was formed by the General Syrian Conference in September 2017. The domestic group has appointed Mohammed al-Sheikh as head of the Government with 11 more ministers for Interior, Justice, Endowment, Higher Education, Education, Health, Agriculture, Economy, Social Affairs and Displaced, Housing and Reconstruction and Local Administration and Services. Al-Sheikh, in a press conference held at the Bab al-Hawa Border Crossing has also announced the formation of four commissions: Inspection Authority, Prisoners and missing Affairs, Planning and Statistics Authority, and the Union of Trade Unions. The founder of the Free Syrian Army, Col. Riad al-Asaad, was appointed as deputy prime minister for military affairs. The SSG is associated with Hay'at Tahrir al-Sham (HTS) and not recognised by the rest of the opposition, which is in conflict with HTS.

There is a sharp ideological divide between the two competing opposition civil authorities: The SIG espouses secular, moderate values and regularly participates in international peace talks; the SSG enforces a strict interpretation of Islamic law and stringently rejects talks with the Syrian regime.

Territorial control

Various Syrian opposition groups have at least some presence in seven Syrian governorates, though none is fully under the control of the entity. Governorates with partial opposition control include:

Governorates under partial control of opposition groups aligned with the Syrian Interim Government:
Latakia Governorate - Control on Eastern areas next to Idlib.
Idlib Governorate - 
Hama Governorate - Limited Control on Northern areas next to Idlib.
Aleppo Governorate
Hasakah Governorate
Raqqa Governorate

Governorates under partial control of opposition groups aligned with the Syrian Democratic Council:
Hasakah Governorate
Raqqa Governorate
Aleppo Governorate
Deir ez-Zor Governorate

Turkish-Controlled territories and territories controlled by the Syrian Interim Government
In April 2015, after the Second Battle of Idlib, the interim seat of the Syrian Interim Government was proposed to be Idlib, in the Idlib Governorate. However, this move was rejected by the al-Nusra Front and Ahrar al-Sham-led Army of Conquest, which between them controlled Idlib. According to the Syrian National Coalition, in 2017 there were 404 opposition-aligned local councils operating in villages, towns, and cities controlled by rebel forces. In 2016, the Syrian Interim Government became established within the Turkish Controlled areas.

Territories governed by the Salvation Government
The Salvation Government extends authority mostly in the Idlib Governorate.

Al-Tanf Garrison

The Syrian Free Army maintains the al-Tanf Garrison.  Due to this garrison being inside an American De-Escalation zone, the garrison is not often attacked, nor does it often attempt to expand its territory.

Recognition and foreign relations

The foreign relations of the Syrian Opposition refers to the external relations of the self-proclaimed oppositional Syrian Arab Republic, which sees itself as the genuine Syria. The region of control of Syrian opposition affiliated groups is not well defined. The Turkish government recognizes Syrian opposition as the genuine Syrian Arab Republic and hosts several of its institutions on its territory. The seat of Syria in the Arab League is reserved for the Syrian opposition since 2014, but not populated.

The opposition as a whole is characterised as "terrorist" by Iran, Russia and Syria.

Military forces

Initially, the Free Syrian Army was perceived as the ultimate military force of the Syrian Opposition, but with the collapse of many FSA factions and emergence of powerful Islamist groups, it became clear to the opposition that only a cooperation of secular military forces and moderate Islamists could form a sufficient coalition to battle both the Syrian Government forces and radical Jihadists such as ISIL and in some cases al-Nusra Front.

In 2014, the military forces associated with the Syrian Opposition were defined by the Syrian Revolutionary Command Council, which in turn was mainly relying on the Free Syrian Army (with links to Syrian National Coalition) and the Islamic Front (Syria). Members of the Syrian Revolutionary Command Council:
Free Syrian Army: Paramilitary that has been active during the Syrian civil war. Composed mainly of defected Syrian Armed Forces personnel, its formation was announced on 29 July 2011 in a video released on the Internet by a uniformed group of deserters from the Syrian military who called upon members of the Syrian army to defect and join them. The leader of the group, who identified himself as Colonel Riad al-Asaad, announced that the Free Syrian Army would work with demonstrators to bring down the system, and declared that all security forces attacking civilians are justified targets. It has also been reported that many former Syrian Consulates are trying to band together a Free Syrian Navy from fishermen and defectors to secure the coast.
Syrian Turkmen Brigades: An armed opposition structure of Syrian Turkmens fighting against Syrian Armed Forces. It is also the military wing of Syrian Turkmen Assembly. It is led by Colonel Muhammad Awad and Ali Basher.

Syrian Free Army - Free Syrian Army unit trained by, and politically very close too, the United States. It remains the last unit in the Al-Tanf area, and functions as the de facto opposition government there.
 Islamic Front: An Islamist rebel group formed in November 2013 and led by Ahrar al-Sham. It was always a loose alliance and was defunct by 2015.

Other rebel fighting forces:
Syrian Islamic Liberation Front: The major rebel fighting coalition independent of the FSA in the period 2012–2013, including the moderate Islamist groups Suqour al-Sham, Al-Tawhid Brigade and Jaysh al-Islam, deploying up to half the opposition's fighting force. It main members joined the Islamic Front in 2013.
Turkish-backed Free Syrian Army: A coalition of mainly Arab and Turkmen opposition fighters in Northern Syria, armed and backed by Turkey since May 2017, partially reorganized as the Syrian National Army in December 2017. 
National Front for Liberation: A coalition of FSA groups in Idlib and NW Syria formed in early 2018 and backed by Turkey.
Syrian Liberation Front: An Islamist rebel group formed in early 2018 and including Ahrar al-Sham and the Nour al-Din al-Zenki Movement, the largest rebel fighting groups in NW Syria.

List of opposition figures
Abdulrazak Eid, Syrian writer and thinker, participated in finding the Committees for the Civil Society in Syria, wrote the first draft of the Statement of 1000, and participated in drafting the Damascus Declaration, president of the national council of Damascus Declaration abroad.
Ammar Abdulhamid, leading Human-Rights Advocate, Founder of Tharwa Foundation, first Syrian to testify in front of American Congress 2006/2008, briefed Presidents of the United States, and called for Syria Revolution in 2006.
Aref Dalilah, prominent economist, professor, former member of Syrian Parliament and a member of the Damascus Declaration
Burhan Ghalioun, former head of the SNC
Riad al-Asaad, a leader in the Free Syrian Army
Riad Seif, former head of the Forum for National Dialogue
Riyad al-Turk, ex-communist politician and liberal democrat
Haitham al-Maleh, leading human rights activist and former judge
Anwar al-Bunni, human rights lawyer, democracy activist and political prisoner
Maher Arar, Syrian-Canadian human rights activist
Marwan Habash, politician and writer and pre-Assad Minister of Industry
Michel Kilo, Christian writer and human rights activist, who has been called "one of Syria's leading opposition thinkers"
Kamal al-Labwani, doctor and artist, considered one of the most prominent members of the Syrian opposition movement
Tal al-Mallohi, blogger from Homs and world's youngest prisoner of conscience
Yassin al-Haj Saleh, writer and political dissident
Fares Tammo, son of assassinated Kurdish politician Mashaal Tammo
Bassma Kodmani, an academic and former spokesperson of the SNC
Radwan Ziadeh, co-spokesperson for the SNC
Randa Kassis, president of the Coalition of Secular and Democratic Syrians
Fadwa Suleiman, leader of protests in Homs
Razan Ghazzawi, prominent blogger
Samar Yazbek, Syrian author and journalist. She was awarded the 2012 PEN Pinter International Writer of Courage Award for her book, A Woman in the Crossfire: Diaries of the Syrian Revolution. She fled Syria in 2011 but continues to be an outspoken critic of the al-Assad government from abroad, from Europe and the US.
Razan Zaitouneh, leader in the Local Coordination Committees of Syria and the 2011 Sakharov Prize winner
Muhammad al-Yaqoubi Sunni Muslim scholar and preacher, currently residing in exile in Morocco
Hussam Awak, ex-Syrian Air Force and Air Force Intelligence Directorate officer who later joined the Syrian Democratic Forces

See also

Belligerents in the Syrian Civil War
List of political parties in Syria

References

External links
Syrian Civil War Overview

 
Politics of Syria
Political opposition
Rebel groups that actively control territory
Member states of the Arab League
Anti-government factions of the Syrian civil war
States and territories established in 2013